Sivill House is a Grade II listed 76-flat council housing block on Columbia Road in Shoreditch, in the London Borough of Tower Hamlets.

Sivill House was designed in the Constructivist style by Douglas Bailey, Francis Skinner and Berthold Lubetkin, the successors to the Tecton Group, and was completed in 1962. The nearby Dorset Estate was also designed by the same team.

References 

Skyscrapers in the London Borough of Tower Hamlets
Berthold Lubetkin buildings
Residential skyscrapers in London
Shoreditch